is a city located in central Miyagi Prefecture, Japan. , the city had an estimated population of 52,433, and a population density of 1,100 persons per km² in 19,535 households.

Geography
Tomiya is located in central Miyagi Prefecture, bordered by the Sendai metropolis to the south.

Neighboring municipalities
Miyagi Prefecture
Sendai
Taiwa
Rifu

Climate
The city has a climate characterized by cool summers and long cold winters (Köppen climate classification Cfa).  The average annual temperature in Tomiya is 12.1 °C. The average annual rainfall is 1251 mm with September as the wettest month. The temperatures are highest on average in August, at around 24.8 °C, and lowest in January, at around 0.6 °C.

Demographics
Per Japanese census data, the population of Tomiya has expanded rapidly over the past 50 years.

History
The area of present-day Tomiya was part of ancient Mutsu Province, and has been settled since at least the Jōmon period by the Emishi people. During later portion of the Heian period, the area was ruled by the Northern Fujiwara. During the Sengoku period, the area was contested by various samurai clans before the area came under the control of the Date clan of Sendai Domain during the Edo period, under the Tokugawa shogunate. During the Edo period, Tomiya was a post town on the Ōshū Kaidō highway connecting Edo with northern Japan.

The village of Tomiya was created on April 1, 1889 with the post-Meiji restoration establishment of the modern municipalities system. It was raised to town status on April 1, 1963 and raised to city status on October 10, 2016.

Government
Tomita has a mayor-council form of government with a directly elected mayor and a unicameral city legislature of 20 members. Tomita, together with Kurokawa District collectively contributes two seats to the Miyagi Prefectural legislature. In terms of national politics, the city is part of Miyagi 4th district of the lower house of the Diet of Japan.

Economy
Tomiya has a mixed economy with five industrial parks, but is also noted for its production of blueberries and bean sprouts. The city is also  a bedroom community for the neighboring metropolis of Sendai.

Education
Tomiya has eight public elementary schools and five public middle schools operated by the city government, and one public high school operated by the Miyagi Prefectural Board of Education. The prefectural also operations one special education school for the handicapped.

Transportation

Railway
Tomiya does not have any passenger railway service.

Highway
  – Tomiya Junction
  – Tomiya Junction – Tomiya Interchange

References

External links

Official Website 

 
Cities in Miyagi Prefecture
Populated places established in 2016